Mexico competed at the 1972 Summer Olympics in Munich, West Germany. 174 competitors, 152 men and 22 women, took part in 112 events in 20 sports.

Medalists

Silver
 Alfonso Zamora — Boxing, Men's Bantamweight

Archery

In the first modern archery competition at the Olympics, Mexico entered three men and three women. The women were much more successful than the men, though none of the archers won a medal. Their highest placing competitor was Francisca de Gutierrez, at 10th place in the women's competition.

Women's Individual Competition:
 Francisca de Gutierrez – 2353 points (→ 10th place)
 Aurora Bretón – 2335 points (→ 15th place)
 Silvia de Tapia – 2258 points (→ 23rd place)

Men's Individual Competition:
 Alfonso Jones – 2344 points (→ 28th place)
 Rafael Aveleira – 2178 points (→ 51st place)
 José Almanzor – 2175 points (→ 52nd place)

Athletics

Men's 5,000 metres
Mario Pérez
 Heat — 13:58.2 (→ did not advance)

Pedro Miranda
 Heat — 13:45.2 (→ did not advance)

Men's 10,000 metres
Juan Máximo Martínez
Pedro Miranda

Men's Marathon
Jacinto Sabinal
Alfredo Peñaloza	
Rafael Tadeo

Men's 20 km Walk
José Oliveros
Pedro Aroche
Ismael Avila

Men's 50 km Walk
Gabriel Hernández
Raúl González
José Oliveros

Boxing

Men's Light Flyweight (– 48 kg)
 Salvador García
 First Round — Lost to Ralph Evans (GBR), 1:4

Men's Flyweight (– 51 kg)
Arturo Delgado

Men's Bantamweight
Alfonso Zamora

Men's Featherweight
Juan Francisco García

Men's Lightweight
Antonio Gin

Men's Welterweight
Sergio Lozano

Men's Light Middleweight (– 71 kg)
Emeterio Villanueva
 First Round — Bye
 Second Round — Defeated Alfredo Lemus (VEN), 4:1
 Third Round — Defeated Christopher Elliott (IRL), TKO-3
 Quarterfinals — Lost to Peter Tiepold (GDR), 0:5

Men's Middleweight
José Luis Espinosa

Canoeing

Cycling

Six cyclists represented Mexico in 1972.

Individual road race
 Jesús Sarabia — 10th place
 Agustín Alcántara — did not finish (→ no ranking)
 Francisco Vázquez — did not finish (→ no ranking)
 Francisco Javier Huerta — did not finish (→ no ranking)

Team time trial
 Agustín Alcántara
 Antonio Hernández
 Francisco Huerta
 Francisco Vázquez

Sprint
 Arturo Cambroni

1000m time trial
 Arturo Cambroni
 Final — 1:11.54 (→ 24th place)

Individual pursuit
 Francisco Huerta

Diving

Men's 3m Springboard
 Carlos Armando Giron – 521.88 points (→ 9th place)
 José de Jesus Robinson – 514.02 points (→ 11th place)
 Porfirio Becerril – 310.65 points (→ 27th place)

Men's 10m Platform
 Carlos Armando Giron – 442.41 points (→ 8th place)
 José de Jesus Robinson – 284.58 points (→ 14th place)
 Porfirio Becerril – 282.57 points (→ 15th place)

Women's 3m Springboard
 Bertha Baraldi – 252.66 points (→ 15th place)

Women's 10m Platform
 Bertha Baraldi – 174.21 points (→ 20th place)

Equestrian

Fencing

Six fencers, all men, represented Mexico in 1972.

Men's foil
 Carlos Calderón
 Vicente Calderón

Men's épée
 Luis Stephens
 Jorge Castillejos
 Carlos Calderón

Men's team épée
 Carlos Calderón, Jorge Castillejos, Hermilo Leal, Luis Stephens

Men's sabre
 Roberto Alva
 Vicente Calderón
 Hermilo Leal

Football

Men's Team Competition
Preliminary Round (Group 2)
 Defeated Sudan (1-0)
 Defeated Burma (1-0)
 Lost to Soviet Union (1-4)
Second Round (Group A)
 Drew with West Germany (1-1)
 Lost to East Germany (0-7)
 Lost to Hungary (0-2)
 Did not advance → Seventh place

 Team Roster
 Juan Manuel Álvarez
 Francisco Barba Ordaz
 Fernando Blanco Garell
 Manuel Borja Garcia
 Leonardo Cuellar Rivera
 Alejandro Hernandez Pat
 Alfredo Hernandez Martinez
 Manuel Manzo
 Salvador Marquez Ramos
 Enrique Martin del Campo
 Alejandro Peña
 Daniel Razo Marquez
 David Regalado
 Lorenzo Reyes
 Jesus Rico Espejel
 Rogelio Ruiz Vaquera
 Horacio Sánchez Marquez
 José Angel Talavera
 José Luis Trejo Montoya

Gymnastics

Hockey

Men's Team Competition
Preliminary Round (Group B)
 Lost to Great Britain (0-6)
 Lost to New Zealand (0-7)
 Lost to Poland (0-3)
 Lost to Australia (0-10)
 Lost to the Netherlands (0-4)
 Lost to India (0-8)
 Lost to Kenya (1-2)
Classification Match
 15th/16th place: Lost to Uganda (1-4) → 16th place

Team Roster
Adán Noriega
David Sevilla
José Luis Partida
Enrique Filoteo
Francisco Ramírez
Héctor Ventura
Javier Varela
José Miguel Huacuja
José María Mascaro
Juan Calderón
Manuel Fernández
Manuel Noriega
Noel Gutiérrez
Orlando Ventura
Oscar Huacuja
Rubén Vasconcelos
Víctor Contreras

Judo
Raul Furlon
Luis Arredondo
Epigmenio Etchiga

Modern pentathlon

Three male pentathletes represented Mexico in 1972.

Men's Individual Competition:
 Gilberto Toledano – 4428 points (→ 42nd place)
 Eduarde Olivera Lastra – 4426 points (→ 43rd place)
 Juan José Castilla – 4014 points (→ 55th place)

Men's Team Competition:
 Toledano Sanchez, Olivera Lastra, and Castilla Ramos – 12901 points (→ 17th place)

Alternate Member:
Rafael Alvarez Perez

Rowing

Men's Single Sculls
Guillermo Spamer
Heat — 8:38.63
Repechage — 8:40.76 (→ did not advance)

Sailing

Shooting

Ten shooters, nine men and one woman, represented Mexico in 1972.

25 m pistol
 Homero Laddaga
 Mario Sánchez

50 m pistol
 Juventino Sánchez

300 m rifle, three positions
 Olegario Vázquez
 Jesús Elizondo

50 m rifle, three positions
 Olegario Vázquez
 Jesús Elizondo

50 m rifle, prone
 Ernesto Montemayor, Jr.
 Olegario Vázquez

Trap
 Fernando Walls
 David Alkon

Skeet
 Nuria Ortíz
 Juan Bueno

Swimming

Men's 100m Freestyle
Roberto Strauss
 Heat — 56.78s (→  did not advance)

Men's 200m Freestyle
Guillermo García
 Heat — DNS (→  did not advance)

Roberto Strauss
 Heat — 2:03.57 (→  did not advance)

Men's 400m Freestyle
Guillermo García
José Luis Prado

Men's 1500m Freestyle
Guillermo García
Alberto García

Men's 100m Backstroke
José Joaquín Santibáñez

Men's 200m Backstroke
Rafael Rocha
José Urueta

Men's 100m Breaststroke
Felipe Muñoz
Gustavo Salcedo

Men's 200m Breaststroke
Felipe Muñoz
Gustavo Salcedo

Men's 100m Butterfly
Hugo Valencia

Men's 200m Butterfly
Hugo Valencia
Ricardo Marmolejo

Men's 200m Individual Medley
Ricardo Marmolejo
José Joaquín Santibáñez

Men's 400m Individual Medley
Ricardo Marmolejo
José Luis Prado

Men's 4 × 100 m Freestyle Relay
Jorge Urreta, José Santibañez, Guillermo García and Roberto Strauss
 Heat — DNF (→  did not advance)

Men's 4 × 200 m Freestyle Relay
Guillermo García, Roberto Strauss, José Luis Prado, and Jorge Urreta
 Heat — 8:08.39 (→  did not advance)

Men's 4 × 100 m Medley Relay

Women's 100m Freestyle

Women's 200m Freestyle

Women's 400m Freestyle

Women's 800m Freestyle

Women's 100m Backstroke

Women's 200m Backstroke

Women's 100m Breaststroke

Women's 200m Breaststroke

Women's 100m Butterfly

Women's 200m Butterfly

Women's 200m Individual Medley

Women's 400m Individual Medley

Women's 4 × 100 m Freestyle Relay

Women's 4 × 100 m Medley Relay

Water polo

Men's Team Competition
Preliminary Round (Group A)
 Lost to Cuba (4-6)
 Defeated Canada (7-3)
 Lost to Yugoslavia (3-5)
 Lost to United States (5-7)
 Lost to Romania (6-9) → Did not advance

 Team Roster
 Daniel Goméz Bilbao
 Arturo Valencia Cadena
 Alfredo Sauza Martinéz
 Francisco Garcia Moreno
 Juan Manuel Garcia Moreno
 Raul Alanis Guerrero
 Maximiliano Aguilar Salazar
 Armando Fernandez Alatorre
 Ricardo Chapa Galaviz
 Rafael Azpeitia Lopez
 Victor Manuel Garcia Romero

Weightlifting

Wrestling

See also
Mexico at the 1971 Pan American Games

References

Nations at the 1972 Summer Olympics
1972 Summer Olympics
Olympics